Kathleen Clyde (born May 18, 1979) is a former member of the Ohio House of Representatives, serving from the 75th District from 2011 to 2018.

Early life and career
Clyde is originally from Garrettsville, Ohio.  She was the valedictorian of her class at James A. Garfield High School.  After graduation from the Michael E. Moritz College of Law at Ohio State University, where she served as an editor of the law review, Clyde served as Speaker of the House Armond Budish's deputy legal counsel. She also has worked in the Secretary of State's Office and the Ohio Senate. Clyde is a former president of the Public Interest Law Foundation.

Ohio politics

Ohio House of Representatives 
When incumbent Democrat Kathleen Chandler faced term limits in 2010, Clyde was one of three Democratic challengers who sought to replace Chandler, along with Sean Buchanan and Rick Hawksley. Clyde won the nomination with 56.8% of the electorate. In the general election, Clyde faced three opponents: Republican Roak Zeller, Constitution Party candidate Daniel Cartwright, and Independent Richard Duncan. She defeated all three with 48% of the vote to take the seat.

Clyde was sworn into her first term on January 3, 2011, and is serving on the committees of Agriculture and Natural Resources; Finance and Appropriations and its Higher Education Subcommittee; and State Government and Elections with its Subcommittee on Redistricting.

In 2012, Clyde won reelection with 60.77% of the vote over Republican Nick Skeriotis. She represents the 75th District, which replaced the 68th District.

2018 Ohio Secretary of State campaign 
She faced Ohio State Sen. Frank LaRose in the general election.

During the campaign, Clyde said she would not continue a policy of purging voters from voter rolls if those voters had not voted for six consecutive years. Clyde supported a shift to a uniform paper ballot system in Ohio; LaRose said he favored the current system where there is a requirement for a paper trail for ballots but all counties are allowed to use their own machines. Clyde called for the adoption of postal voting to replace early in-person voting; LaRose supported the existing system which is a combination of early in-person voting and postal voting.

Secretary of State campaign
She launched a bid to serve as the Ohio Secretary of State on May 16, 2017. The election will be held in 2018. On November 6, 2018 Clyde was defeated by State Senator Frank LaRose 46.7 to 50.9%.

Portage County Commissioner
In December 2018, Kathleen Clyde was appointed County Commissioner of Portage County. Portage County was represented by much of the 75th Ohio House District, the district Kathleen represented when in the Ohio house of Representatives. Clyde ran for her first full term as County Commissioner in 2020, but was defeated by Republican Tony Badalamenti.

National politics
Clyde was selected as one of seventeen speakers to jointly deliver the keynote address at the 2020 Democratic National Convention.

Initiatives and positions
Clyde has been critical of a plan by Ohio Secretary of State Jon Husted to not allow voters as much time to cast absentee ballots.  "Voting is already a confusing process," said Rep. Clyde, who was director of the Early Voting Center in Franklin County in 2008. "It discourages voting," she said of Husted's attempt to limit voting processes.

References

External links
Official campaign website

1979 births
21st-century American politicians
21st-century American women politicians
Living people
Democratic Party members of the Ohio House of Representatives
Ohio State University Moritz College of Law alumni
People from Garrettsville, Ohio
People from Kent, Ohio
Wesleyan University alumni
Women state legislators in Ohio